American Embassy School may refer to:
 American Embassy School, New Delhi
 Banjul American Embassy School, now Banjul American International School
 American Embassy School, which merged into the International School of Beijing